Kato Drys is a small village in Cyprus, southwest of Larnaca. It is near the villages of Pano Lefkara (4 km), Kato Lefkara (4 km), and Vavla (6 km).

Its average altitude is 520 meters above sea level.  The village is set in hilly terrain with narrow, deep valleys, through which flows the Agios Minas river.

Kato Drys is pictured on the Cyprus one pound note.

A significant figure from the village is Saint Neophytos, born in Kato Drys in 1134.  The house in which he was born still stands today.  Sir Reo Stakis (1913–2001) was also born in the village.

There is a small church dedicated to the saint located on a hill near the village.

References

External links
  Kato Drys Community Council website

Communities in Larnaca District